Trestka is a Polish coat of arms. It was used by several szlachta families in the times of the Polish–Lithuanian Commonwealth.

History

Blazon

Notable bearers
Notable bearers of this coat of arms include:

See also
 Cieleski (variation of CoA Trestka)
 Polish heraldry
 Heraldic family
 List of Polish nobility coats of arms

Bibliography
 Juliusz Ostrowski, Księga herbowa rodów polskich. Warszawa 1897
 Tadeusz Gajl: Herbarz polski od średniowiecza do XX wieku : ponad 4500 herbów szlacheckich 37 tysięcy nazwisk 55 tysięcy rodów. L&L, 2007. .

Trestka